Paicines is an unincorporated community in San Benito County, California. The community is at the intersection of Panoche Road and SR 25. Bolado County Park is just over three miles (5 km) north of the community and the site of the San Benito County Fair.

History 
Paicines originated in a community that arose on Rancho Ciénega de los Paicines, a rancho grant issued by Governor Juan Bautista Alvarado in 1842 to Ángel María Castro and José Antonio Rodríguez.

The town of Paicines was originally located 5 miles north of the town of Tres Pinos.  The opposite is true today.

The railroad was tasked to build a line to Tres Pinos.  By 1873 they made it to Paicines but did not wish to continue building more line.  So in 1874 the names of the two towns were switched so the railroad could say they had fulfilled their commitment to build a line all the way to Tres Pinos.

Geography
Hydrologic features in the area include Tres Pinos Creek, the San Benito River, and the Paicines Reservoir. The area is in the San Andreas Rift Zone area in proximity to the San Andreas Fault. Areas to the south and east are mountainous. The county line runs along the Gabilan Range.

The community is a gateway to Pinnacles National Park, a National Park straddling the mountains along the Monterey-San Benito County line.

The ZIP Code is 95043. The community is inside area code 831. The local prefix is 389. Local telephone service is provided by Pinnacles Telephone Co., an independent telephone company.

Politics 
In the state legislature, Paicines is located in the 12th Senate District, represented by Republican Anthony Cannella, and in the 28th Assembly District, represented by Democrat Anna M. Caballero.

Climate
According to the Köppen Climate Classification system, Paicines has a semi-arid climate, abbreviated "BSk" on climate maps.

Notable residents
Famous people associated with Paicines include Lieutenant General Janet C. Wolfenbarger, the highest-ranking woman in the United States Air Force; her parents Eldon and Shirley Libby reside in Paicines.

Charlie Root, the famous Chicago Cubs pitcher and coach, retired there to a ranch. Actress Judy Garland (born Frances Ethel Gumm; 10 June 1922 – 22 June 1969) married her third husband, Sid Luft, at what was then known as The Law Ranch, now called The Paicines Ranch. Tiburcio Vásquez, a bandido, was active in the area.

See also 
 County Route J1 (California)/Panoche Road
 Panoche, California
 Tres Pinos, California

References

External links 
 Paicines Ranch, a long-time landmark.

Unincorporated communities in San Benito County, California
Unincorporated communities in California